April Love may refer to:
April Love (film), a 1957 musical film
"April Love" (song), a song from the film
April Love (painting), an Arthur Hughes painting